Siegfried is a German-language male given name, composed from the Germanic elements sig "victory" and frithu "protection, peace".
The German name has the Old Norse cognate Sigfriðr, Sigfrøðr, which gives rise to Swedish Sigfrid (hypocorisms Sigge, Siffer), Danish/Norwegian Sigfred. In Norway, Sigfrid is given as a feminine name.

The name is medieval and was borne by the legendary dragon-slayer also known as Sigurd. It did survive in marginal use into the modern period, but after 1876 it enjoyed renewed popularity due to Wagner's  Siegfried.

Notable people with the name include:

Medieval 
 Siegfried, Count of Merseburg (died 937)
 Siegfried I the Older, Count of Walbeck (died 990)
 Sigfried, Count of the Ardennes (c. 922–998), founder of Luxembourg
 Siegfried I, Count of Stade (before 929–after 961)
 Siegfried (bishop of Piacenza) (died 1031)
 Siegfried II, Count of Stade (c. 956–1037)
 Sigfrid of Sweden (died 1045), English missionary to Sweden and patron saint of Växjö
 Siegfried I, Count of Sponheim (c. 1010–1065)
 Siegfried I (archbishop of Mainz) (died 1084)
 Siegfried of Ballenstedt (c. 1075–1113)
 Siegfried IV, Count of Northeim-Boyneburg and Homburg (fl. 12th century)
 Siegfried (archbishop of Bremen) (1132–1184)
 Siegfried III, Count of Weimar-Orlamünde (c. 1155 – 1206)
 Siegfried II (archbishop of Mainz) (died 1230)
 Siegfried III (archbishop of Mainz) (died 1249)
 Siegfried I, Prince of Anhalt-Zerbst (c. 1230 – 1298)
 Siegfried II of Westerburg (before 1260–1297)
 Siegfried II of Querfurt (died 1310)
 Siegfried von Feuchtwangen (died 1311), 15th Grand Master of the Teutonic Knights
 Sigfrid of Pannonhalma (died 1365), Hungarian abbot

Modern
 Siegfried Lipiner (1856–1911), Austrian poet and author
 Siegfried Wagner (1869–1930), German composer, conductor, and opera director, son of Richard Wagner
 Siegfried "Fritz" Flesch (1872–1939), Austrian saber fencer
 Siegfried Translateur (1875–1944), Austrian composer of dance music
 Siegfried Sassoon (1886–1967), English poet, named Siegfried by his mother because of her love of Wagner's operas
 Siegfried Aram (1891–1978), German lawyer and cultural politician
 Siegfried Kasche (1903–1947), German Nazi Storm Trooper officer and ambassador executed for war crimes
Siegfried Fehmer (1911–1948), German Nazi Gestapo officer executed for war crimes
Siegfried Seidl (1911–1947), Austrian Nazi commander of the Theresienstadt concentration camp executed for war crimes
Siegfried Lowitz (1914–1999), German actor 
 Siegfried Rapp (1915–1982), one-armed German pianist
Siegfried Buback (1920–1977), Attorney General of Germany 
Siegfried Böhm (1928–1980), East German politician
 Siegfried Ziering (1928–2000), German-born American business executive, playwright and philanthropist
Siegfried Rauch (1932–2018), German actor 
Siegfried Fischbacher (1939–2021), German-American magician
 Siegfried Jerusalem (born 1940), German operatic tenor

Fictional characters 

 Sigurd or Siegfried, the legendary dragon-slaying hero in Nibelungenlied 
 Siegfried, leading character in the opera of the same name
 Die Nibelungen: Siegfried, the first of Fritz Lang's two-film series, Die Nibelungen
 Siegfried, a character in History's Strongest Disciple Kenichi
 Siegfried (Get Smart), fictional character in 1960s American spy comedy television series Get Smart
 Siegfried, a principal character in the ballet Swan Lake
 Siegfried Farnon, one of the main characters in All Creatures Great and Small
 Siegfried Schtauffen and Nightmare, two interconnected characters of the Soulcalibur series of fighting games
 Dubhe Alpha Siegfried, Saint Seiya anime series character
 Siegfried Kircheis, a character in the series of Japanese science fiction novels Legend of the Galactic Heroes
 Siegfried, a recurring demon in the Shin Megami Tensei video game series
 Siegfried, the Saber of Black in the anime Fate/Apocrypha
Siegfried of Denesle, a side character in the video game series The Witcher

See also
 Sig (given name)

References

German masculine given names

it:Siegfried
ja:ジークフリート (曖昧さ回避)
pl:Zygfryd
sv:Siegfried